Cheryl Ann Haworth (born April 19, 1983) is an Olympic weightlifter for the United States.

Early life
Haworth was born  in Savannah, Georgia, to Shiela and Robert Haworth. She also has two sisters, Katie and Beth. At the age of 12, she began weightlifting to strengthen her muscles for softball. She graduated from Savannah Arts Academy in 2001 and received a degree from Savannah College of Art and Design in 2006.

Personal life
Her youngest sister Katie is also a champion weightlifter. After retiring from active competition, Cheryl married her wife Kalen Curtis on February 28, 2014. Haworth is also an artist and has a sold a number of paintings for hundreds of dollars.

List of weightlifting achievements
 Bronze Medalist in Olympic Games (2000)
 Olympic team member (2000 + 2004 + 2008)
 Junior World Champion (2001 + 2002)
 Senior National Champion (1998–2008)
 Silver Medalist in Junior World Championships (1999)
 Pan Am Games Champion (1999)
 Goodwill Games Champion (2001)
 Inducted into the USA Weightlifting Hall of Fame (2015)

Documentary
Strong! is a 2012 documentary by Julie Wyman. It is about Cheryl Haworth's efforts at the end of her career to compete at the 2008 Summer Olympics in Beijing.

References

External links

 picture of Ch. Haworth, 2008

1983 births
Living people
Weightlifters at the 1999 Pan American Games
Weightlifters at the 2000 Summer Olympics
Weightlifters at the 2004 Summer Olympics
Weightlifters at the 2008 Summer Olympics
Olympic bronze medalists for the United States in weightlifting
American LGBT sportspeople
LGBT people from Georgia (U.S. state)
Sportspeople from Savannah, Georgia
American female weightlifters
Medalists at the 2000 Summer Olympics
Pan American Games gold medalists for the United States
Pan American Games medalists in weightlifting
Lesbian sportswomen
LGBT weightlifters
World Weightlifting Championships medalists
Competitors at the 2001 Goodwill Games
Medalists at the 1999 Pan American Games
21st-century LGBT people
21st-century American women